
Year 236 (CCXXXVI) was a leap year starting on Friday (link will display the full calendar) of the Julian calendar. At the time, it was known as the Year of the Consulship of Verus and Africanus (or, less frequently, year 989 Ab urbe condita). The denomination 236 for this year has been used since the early medieval period, when the Anno Domini calendar era became the prevalent method in Europe for naming years.

Events 
 By place 
 Roman Empire 
 Emperor Maximinus Thrax and Marcus Pupienus Africanus Maximus become Roman consuls.
 The Roman Senate appoints a twenty-man committee to co-ordinate operations against Maximinus.
 Maximinus campaigns against Dacians and Sarmatians from his supply depot at Sirmium.

 By topic 
 Religion 
 January 10 – Pope Fabian succeeds Pope Anterus as the twentieth pope.
 Fabian separates Rome into seven deaconships.
 Fabian sends seven missionaries to Gaul to evangelize in the large cities.

Births 
 Wu of Jin (Sima Yan), Chinese emperor (d. 290)
 Zhang Ti, Chinese official and chancellor (d. 280)
 Zhou Chu, Chinese general and politician (d. 297)

Deaths 
 January 3 – Anterus, bishop of Rome
 July 4 – Dong Zhao, Chinese official and politician (b. 156)
 Zhang Zhao, Chinese general and politician (b. 156)

References